Lucrezia Borgia (18 April 1480 – 24 June 1519) was an Italian noblewoman of the House of Borgia who was the daughter of Pope Alexander VI and Vannozza dei Cattanei. She reigned as the Governor of Spoleto, a position usually held by cardinals, in her own right.

Her family arranged several marriages for her that advanced their own political position including Giovanni Sforza, Lord of Pesaro and Gradara, Count of Cotignola; Alfonso of Aragon, Duke of Bisceglie and Prince of Salerno; and Alfonso I d'Este, Duke of Ferrara. Tradition has it that Alfonso of Aragon was an illegitimate son of the King of Naples and that her brother Cesare Borgia may have had him murdered after his political value waned.

Rumors about her and her family cast Lucrezia as a femme fatale, a role in which she has been portrayed in many artworks, novels and films.

Early life

Lucrezia Borgia was born on 18 April 1480 at Subiaco, near Rome. Her mother was Vannozza dei Cattanei, one of the mistresses of Lucrezia's father, Cardinal Rodrigo de Borgia (later Pope Alexander VI). During her early life, Lucrezia Borgia's education was entrusted to Adriana Orsini de Milan, a close confidant of her father. Her education would primarily take place in the Piazza Pizzo de Merlo, a building adjacent to her father's residence. Unlike most educated women of her time, for whom convents were the primary source for knowledge, her education came from within the sphere of intellectuals in the court and close relatives, and it included a solid grounding in the Humanities, which the Catholic Church was reviving at the time.  She was a thoroughly accomplished princess, fluent in Spanish, Catalan, Italian, and French, which prepared her for advantageous marriage to any European monarch or prince, and literate in both Latin and Greek. She would also become proficient in the lute, poetry, and oration. The biggest testament to her intelligence is her capability in administration, as later on in life she took care of Vatican City correspondence and governance of Ferrara.

Marriages

First marriage: Giovanni Sforza (Lord of Pesaro and Gradara)

On 26 February 1491, a matrimonial arrangement was drawn up between Lucrezia and the Lord of Val D'Ayora, in the kingdom of Valencia, Don Cherubino Joan de Centelles, which was annulled less than two months later in favour of a new contract engaging Lucrezia to Don Gaspare Aversa, count of Procida. When Rodrigo became Pope Alexander VI, he sought to be allied with powerful princely families and founding dynasties of Italy. He therefore called off Lucrezia's previous engagements and arranged for her to marry Giovanni Sforza, a member of the House of Sforza who was Lord of Pesaro and titled Count of Catignola. Giovanni was an illegitimate son of Costanzo I Sforza and a Sforza of the second rank. He married Lucrezia on 12 June 1493 in Rome.

Before long, the Borgia family no longer needed the Sforzas, and the presence of Giovanni Sforza in the papal court was superfluous. The Pope needed new, more advantageous political alliances, so he might have covertly ordered the execution of Giovanni: the generally accepted version is that Lucrezia was informed of this by her brother Cesare, and she warned her husband, who fled Rome.

Alexander asked Giovanni's uncle, Cardinal Ascanio Sforza, to persuade Giovanni to agree to an annulment of the marriage. Giovanni refused and accused Lucrezia of paternal incest. The pope asserted that his daughter's marriage had not been consummated and was thus invalid. Giovanni was offered her dowry in return for his cooperation. The Sforza family threatened to withdraw their protection should he refuse. Giovanni finally signed confessions of impotence and documents of annulment before witnesses.

Alleged affair with Perotto
There has been speculation that during the prolonged process of the annulment, Lucrezia consummated a relationship with someone, perhaps Alexander's chamberlain Pedro Calderon, also named Perotto. In any case, families hostile to the Borgias would later accuse her of being pregnant at the time her marriage was annulled for non-consummation. She is known to have retired to the convent of San Sisto in June 1497 to await the outcome of the annulment proceedings, which were finalized in December of the same year. The bodies of Pedro Calderon and a maid, Pantasilea, were found in the Tiber in February 1498. In March 1498, the Ferrarese ambassador claimed that Lucrezia had given birth, but this was denied by other sources. A child was born, however, in the Borgia household the year before Lucrezia's marriage to Alfonso of Aragon. He was named Giovanni but is known to historians as the "Infans Romanus".

In 1501, two papal bulls were issued concerning the child, Giovanni Borgia. In the first, he was recognized as Cesare's child from an affair before his marriage. The second, contradictory, bull recognized him as the son of Pope Alexander VI. Lucrezia's name is not mentioned in either, and rumours that she was his mother have never been proven. The second bull was kept secret for many years, and Giovanni was assumed to be Cesare's son. This is supported by the fact that in 1502 he became Duke of Camerino, one of Cesare's recent conquests, hence the natural inheritance of the Duke of Romagna's oldest son. Giovanni went to stay with Lucrezia in Ferrara after Alexander's death, where he was accepted as her half-brother.

Second marriage: Alfonso d'Aragon (Duke of Bisceglie and Prince of Salerno)

Following her annulment from Sforza, Lucrezia was married to the Neapolitan Alfonso of Aragon, the half-brother of Sancha of Aragon who was the wife of Lucrezia's brother Gioffre Borgia. The marriage was a short one.

They were married in 1498, making Lucrezia the Duchess consort of Bisceglie and Princess consort of Salerno. Lucrezia – not her husband – was appointed governor of Spoleto in 1499; Alfonso fled Rome shortly afterwards but returned at Lucrezia's request, only to be murdered in 1500.

It was widely rumoured that Lucrezia's brother Cesare was responsible for Alfonso's death, as he had recently allied himself (through marriage) with France against Naples. Lucrezia and Alfonso had one child, Rodrigo of Aragon, who was born in 1499 and predeceased his mother in August 1512 at the age of 12.

Third marriage: Alfonso d'Este (Duke of Ferrara)

After the death of Lucrezia's second husband, her father, Pope Alexander VI, arranged a third marriage. She then married Alfonso I d'Este, Duke of Ferrara, in early 1502 in Ferrara. She had eight children during this marriage and was considered a respectable and accomplished Renaissance duchess, effectively rising above her previous reputation and surviving the fall of the Borgias following her father's death.

Neither partner was faithful: beginning in 1503, Lucrezia enjoyed a long relationship with her brother-in-law, Francesco II Gonzaga, Marquess of Mantua. Francesco's wife was the cultured intellectual Isabella d'Este, the sister of Alfonso, to whom Lucrezia had made overtures of friendship to no avail. The affair between Francesco and Lucrezia was passionate, more sexual than sentimental as can be attested in the fevered love letters the pair wrote one another. It has been claimed that the affair ended when Francesco contracted syphilis and had to end sexual relations with Lucrezia. This last assertion is troublesome as Francesco had contracted syphilis before 1500 as it was known that he passed the disease onto his eldest son Federico Gonzaga who was born in 1500. Francesco did not meet Lucrezia until 1502.

Lucrezia also had a love affair with the poet Pietro Bembo during her third marriage. Their love letters were deemed "the prettiest love letters in the world" by the Romantic poet Lord Byron when he saw them in the Ambrosian Library of Milan on 15 October 1816. On the same occasion Byron claimed to have stolen a lock of Lucrezia's hair – "the prettiest and fairest imaginable" – that was also held there on display.

Lucrezia met the famed French soldier, the Chevalier Bayard while the latter was co-commanding the French allied garrison of Ferrara in 1510. According to his biographer, the Chevalier became a great admirer of Lucrezia's, considering her a "pearl on this Earth".

After a long history of complicated pregnancies and miscarriages, on 14 June 1519 Lucrezia gave birth to her tenth child, named Isabella Maria in honour of Alfonso's sister Isabella d'Este. The child was sickly and – fearing she would die unbaptised – Alfonso ordered her to be baptised straightaway with Eleonora della Mirandola and Count Alexandro Serafino as godparents.

Lucrezia had become very weak during the pregnancy and fell seriously ill after the birth. After seeming to recover for two days, she worsened again and died on 24 June the same year. She was buried in the convent of Corpus Domini.

Appearance

 
She is described as having heavy blonde hair that fell past her knees, a beautiful complexion, hazel eyes that changed colour, a full, high bosom, and a natural grace that made her appear to "walk on air". These physical attributes were highly appreciated in Italy during that period. Another description said, "her mouth is rather large, the teeth brilliantly white, her neck is slender and fair, and the bust is admirably proportioned."

One painting, Portrait of a Youth by Dosso Dossi at the National Gallery of Victoria, was identified as a portrait of Lucrezia in November 2008. This painting may be the only surviving formal portrait of Lucrezia Borgia; however, doubts have been cast on that attribution. Several other paintings, such as Veneto's fanciful portrait, have also been said to depict her, but none have been accepted by scholars at present.

According to Mandell Creighton in his History of the Papacy, "Lucrezia… was personally popular through her beauty and her affability.  Her long golden hair, her sweet childish face, her pleasant expression and her graceful ways, seem to have struck all who saw her."

Rumours
Several rumours have persisted throughout the years, primarily speculating as to the nature of the extravagant parties thrown by the Borgia family. One example is the Banquet of Chestnuts. Many of these concern allegations of incest, poisoning, and murder on her part; however, no historical basis for these rumours has ever been brought forward beyond allegations made by rival parties. It is rumoured that Lucrezia was in possession of a hollow ring that she used frequently to poison drinks.

An early 20th-century painting by Frank Cadogan Cowper that hangs in the Tate Britain art gallery in London portrays Lucrezia taking the place of her father, Pope Alexander VI, at an official Vatican meeting. This apparently documents an event, although the moment depicted (a Franciscan friar kissing Lucrezia's feet) was invented by the artist.

Children
Lucrezia was mother to seven or eight known children:
 A miscarriage / stillborn daughter (16 February 1499) 
 Rodrigo of Aragon (1 November 1499 – August 1512), son by Alfonso of Aragon;
 A stillborn daughter (1502), first child by d'Este;
 Alessandro d'Este (1505–1505);
 Ercole II d'Este, Duke of Ferrara (5 April 1508 – 3 October 1559);
 Ippolito II d'Este (25 August 1509 – 1 December 1572). Archbishop of Milan and later Cardinal;
 Alessandro d'Este (1514–1516);
 Leonora d'Este (3 July 1515 – 15 July 1575), a nun and composer;
 Francesco d'Este, Marquess of Massalombarda (1 November 1516 – 2 February 1578);
 Isabella Maria d'Este (born and died on 14 June 1519). Complications at birth caused the death of Lucrezia ten days later.

Giovanni Borgia, "infans Romanus" ("Child of Rome", c. 1498–1548) had his paternity acknowledged by Alexander and Cesare in two Papal bulls, but it was rumoured that he was the child of Lucrezia and Perotto. The child (identified in later life as Lucrezia's half-brother) was most likely the result of a liaison between Rodrigo Borgia (Pope Alexander VI, Lucrezia's father) and an unknown mistress and was not Lucrezia's child.

Maria Bellonci and maybe other biographers claim that Lucrezia gave birth to three children who did not survive infancy, one by Alfonso of Aragon and two by Alfonso d'Este. She is also thought to have had at least four miscarriages.

In popular culture

Literature and opera
 F. M. Klinger's 1791 novel Fausts Leben, Thaten und Höllenfahrt features an episode in which the Borgias figure, including an affair between Faust and Lucrezia.
 French author Victor Hugo wrote in 1833 the stage play Lucrèce Borgia.
 Victor Hugo's play was transformed into a libretto by Felice Romani for Donizetti's opera, Lucrezia Borgia (1834), first performed at La Scala, Milan, 26 December 1833.
 The Dutch writer Louis Couperus published a story called "Lucrezia" in 1920 that takes place between the death of her second husband and the marriage of her third.
 The 1947 historical novel Prince of Foxes by Samuel Shellabarger describes the adventures of the fictional Andrea Orsini, a captain in the service of Cesare Borgia, during his conquest of the Romagna; it was made into a film of the same name in 1949, starring Orson Welles and Tyrone Power.
 Jean Plaidy's two 1958 novels Madonna of the Seven Hills and Light on Lucrezia follow the story of Lucrezia and her entanglement with her father and brothers.
 Lucrezia, Cesare and Alexander play key roles in Cecelia Holland's 1979 historical novel City of God: A Novel of the Borgias.
 In Roberta Gellis's 2003 novel Lucrezia Borgia and the Mother of Poisons, Alfonso d'Este of Ferrara accuses Lucrezia of murder, and she must solve the crime and expose the true murderer.

In fiction
 In the Marvel Comics comic book Avengers West Coast No. 98 (September 1993), the demon Satannish resurrected Borgia as the supervillain Cyana. As a nod to her reputation for poisoning her lovers in life, Cyana could fatally poison people with sharpened nails or a kiss.
 The Family by Mario Puzo; published October 2001 
 The Borgia Bride by Jeanne Kalogridis; published 31 January 2005
 Kathleen McGowan refers to Lucrece, as one of the many unjustly vilified women, in her book The Expected One. She refers in particular to Frank Cadogan Cowper's painting "Lucretia Borgia Reigns in the Vatican in the Absence of Pope Alexander VI" on display at the Tate Gallery in London.
 Blood and Beauty by Sarah Dunant; ; ; Harper Collins Publishers Ltd | 8 July 2013 |
 The Pope's Daughter by Dario Fo, translated from Italian by Antony Shugaar; . Translation copyright (c) 2015 by Europa Editions
 The Vatican Princess by C.W. Gortner; published 9 February 2016
 In the Name of the Family by Sarah Dunant; ; Virago Press 2017
  남편을 내 편으로 만드는 방법 (How to get my husband on my side) by Kitty and spices (novel and manhwa), 2021 (ongoing)

Film and television
 Lucrezia Borgia (1922) is based on the life of Lucrezia, who is played by Liane Haid. Cesare Borgia is portrayed by Conrad Veidt.
 Lucrezia (Estelle Taylor) and Cesare (Warner Oland) Borgia are the major antagonists in Alan Crosland's 1926 silent film Don Juan, starring John Barrymore.
 Lucrezia is the subject of Abel Gance's film Lucrezia Borgia (1935) and of a 1953 French film, played by Martine Carol.
 Lucrezia is the Bride of Vengeance (1949), played by Paulette Goddard, with Macdonald Carey in the role of Cesare Borgia, and John Lund playing Alfonso d'Este (Duke of Ferrara).
 In Walerian Borowczyk's 1973 feature film Immoral Tales, Lucrezia is played by Florence Bellamy.
 In the Italian movie Lucrezia giovane ("Young Lucrezia") that was written and directed in 1974 by Luciano Ercoli (as André Colbert), Lucrezia was played by Simonetta Stefanelli.
 In the 1981 BBC series, The Borgias, Lucrezia was played by Anne-Louise Lambert.
 In the 1982 feature film The Secret Nights of Lucrezia Borgia of director Roberto Bianchi Montero, Lucrezia is played by Sirpa Lane.
 She is featured as a major plot point in the 1994 TV movie The Shaggy Dog. A portrait of her, along with a display case of her rings are featured in a local museum along with a legend that she had written spells to turn her lovers into dogs.  The legend is revealed to be true as the main character accidentally casts one on himself while holding one of her rings and reading its inscription.
 In the pilot episode of the SyFy series Warehouse 13, a jeweled comb, purported to have been created for her by an alchemist, is used by a Iowa lawyer to hypnotize several individuals into causing acts of violence.
 In the video game Assassin's Creed: Brotherhood, Lucrezia is in an incestuous relationship with her brother Cesare. She is kidnapped by the main character, Ezio Auditore and reappears later, a changed woman.
 She is played by Holliday Grainger in the 2011–2013 Showtime/Bravo TV series The Borgias, which explores a theme of incest with Cesare, despite lack of historical evidence for such events. Her character is portrayed not as a ruthless murderer, but initially as a compassionate and sweet young girl who suffers from her family's ambitions, both struggling against and eventually aiding them.
 In the Canal+ television series Borgia, Lucrezia is portrayed by German actress Isolda Dychauk.

See also
 Castello Borgia
 Felice della Rovere
 Route of the Borgias

References

Further reading
 Rafael Sabatini wrote  The Life of Cesare Borgia, 1912, that attempts to treat the Borgias historically.
 Lucrezia Borgia: Life, Love And Death in Renaissance Italy by Sarah Bradford; Viking 2004; 
 Lucrezia Borgia: A Biography by Rachel Erlanger; 1978; 
 Lucrezia Borgia by Maria Bellonci; Phoenix 2002; 
 The Borgias (1971) by Michael Mallett
 Lucretia Borgia (1874?) by Ferdinand Gregorovius (Author); translated in 1903 by John Leslie Garner (Translator)
 The Borgias by Christopher Hibbert; Constable 2011; 
 The Borgias: History's Most Notorious Dynasty by Mary Hollingsworth; Quercus 2011;

External links

 Lucrezia Borgia: The Family Tree in Pictures
 Lucrezia Borgia on IMDb
 Diario De Los Borja Borgia

1480 births
1519 deaths
People from Subiaco, Lazio
Lucrezia Borgia
House of Sforza
Lucrezia
Italian people of Spanish descent
Italian countesses
Italian princesses
Lucrezia
Lucrezia
Lucrezia
Women and the papacy
Illegitimate children of Pope Alexander VI
Italian Renaissance people
16th-century Italian nobility
Deaths in childbirth
Burials at the Corpus Domini Monastery, Ferrara
15th-century Italian women
16th-century Italian women
Renaissance women
Italian patrons of the arts